The 2013 FIRA-AER Women's Sevens – Division B was the third level of international women's rugby sevens competitions organised by FIRA-AER during 2013. It featured one tournament hosted in Bratislava. The winners and runners up, Finland and Norway respectively, were promoted to the 2014 Division A.

Pool stages

Pool A

Slovakia 24-14 Luxembourg
Bulgaria 12-7 Israel
Latvia 34-0 Andorra
Israel 38-0 Luxembourg
Slovakia 0-10 Andorra
Latvia 14-15 Bulgaria
Andorra 17-22 Luxembourg
Latvia 7-15 Israel
Bulgaria 22-12 Slovakia
Israel 36-7 Andorra
Bulgaria 26-14 Luxembourg
Latvia 17-7 Slovakia
Bulgaria 14-14 Andorra
Slovakia 0-22 Israel
Latvia 35-7 Luxembourg

Group B

 Malta 31-5 Turkey
 Finland 50-0 Lithuania
 Norway 51-0 Bosnia & Herzegovina
 Lithuania 0-22 Turkey
 Malta 59-0 Bosnia & Herzegovina
 Norway 7-15 Finland
 Bosnia & Herzegovina 0-43 Turkey
 Norway 32-0 Lithuania
 Finland 22-7 Malta
 Lithuania 41-0 Bosnia & Herzegovina
 Finland 38-0 Turkey
 Norway 24-5 Malta
 Finland 46- Bosnia & Herzegovina 
 Malta 54-0 Lithuania
 Norway 45-5 Turkey

Knockout stage

Bowl
Semi-finals:
Slovakia 36-0 Bosnia & Herzegovina
Luxembourg 21-5 Lithuania
11th-place play-off
Bosnia & Herzegovina 0-47 Lithuania
Final (9th-place play-off)
Slovakia 17-22 Luxembourg

Plate
Semi-finals:
Latvia 36-7 Turkey
Andorra 0-31 Malta
7th-place play-off
Turkey 10-5 Andorra
Final (5th-place play-off)
Latvia 25-10 Malta

Cup
Semi-finals:
Bulgaria 0-45 Norway
Israel 0-17 Finland
3rd-place play-off
Bulgaria 5-10 Israel
Final
Norway 12-25 Finland

References

B
2013
Europe
2013 in Slovak sport
2013 in Slovak women's sport